The grey knifefish (Bathystethus cultratus) is a species of sea chub native to the Pacific Ocean from Australia to New Zealand and the Kermadec Islands. This species is a plankton eater which swims constantly within a few meters of the surface of the ocean.

References

Scorpidinae
Endemic marine fish of New Zealand
Fish described in 1801